David Henderson (born 1954) is an American philosopher and Robert R. Chambers Distinguished Professor of Philosophy at the University of Nebraska–Lincoln. He is known for his works on epistemology and the philosophy of the social sciences.

References

21st-century American philosophers
Philosophy academics
Living people
Epistemologists
1954 births
Date of birth missing (living people)
University of Nebraska–Lincoln faculty